Nell Tiger Free (born 13 October 1999) is a British actress. She is best known for her role as Leanne Grayson in the television series Servant, and as Myrcella Baratheon in seasons 5 and 6 of the television series Game of Thrones, replacing Aimee Richardson. She has also played Chloe Crumb in the film version of Mr. Stink, Anna in the film Broken, and Janey Carter in Amazon Prime's Too Old to Die Young.

Early life and education

Free was born in Kingston upon Thames, London. Her father works in recruitment and her mother is a yoga teacher. She was educated at Teddington School. She began acting while attending Saturday drama class.

Filmography

References

External links
 

1999 births
21st-century English actresses
English child actresses
English television actresses
English film actresses
Actresses from London
People educated at Teddington School
Living people